Vosya is a rural locality (a settlement) in Vokhtozhskoye Rural Settlement, Gryazovetsky District, Vologda Oblast, Russia. The population was 7 as of 2002.

Geography 
It is located 92 km northeast of Gryazovets (the district's administrative centre) by road. Vosya (village) is the nearest rural locality.

References 

Rural localities in Gryazovetsky District